Albert Horton Henderson ( – ) was an American actor. He was born in New York City and died in Los Angeles.

Career 
Henderson was a film and television actor, known for his roles in Car 54, Where Are You? (1961–1963), Coogan's Bluff (1968), Greaser's Palace (1972), Serpico (1973), The Postman Always Rings Twice (1981), and Mr. Jones (1993), among others.

Filmography

Film 

1968: Madigan – Lt. Strong
1968: What's So Bad About Feeling Good? – (uncredited)
1968: Coogan's Bluff – Desk sergeant
1971: The Pursuit of Happiness – Convict McCardle
1972: The Hot Rock – Prison Property Clerk (uncredited)
1972: Greaser's Palace – Seaweedhead Greaser
1973: Cops and Robbers – Cop
1973: Serpico – Peluce
1974: The Super Cops – Captain Arbow
1975: The Reincarnation of Peter Proud – Police Sergeant
1980: Seed of Innocence – Delbert Young
1981: Modern Romance – Head Mixer
1981: The Postman Always Rings Twice – Art Beeman
1987: Barfly – Louie
1988: Big Top Pee-wee – Mr. Ryan
1989: Three Fugitives – Man in Raincoat
1990: The End of Innocence – Grandpa
1991: Trancers II – Wino #3
1993: Mr. Jones – Patient
1995: Leaving Las Vegas – Man at bar

Television 

1957: Harbormaster
1958-1963: Naked City – Patrolman on Beat / Bartender / Police Driver / Landers
1960: Dow Hour of Great Mysteries
1961: Car 54, Where Are You? – Officer O'Hara
1961: Brenner – Patrolman Franklin
1967: N.Y.P.D. – Captain Parnell
1973: Koska and His Family
1976: Bronk
1976: Serpico: The Deadly Game – Sgt. Morgan
1976: Sara – Samuel Higgins
1976: Kojak – Denny Schwartz / Police Captain
1979-1981: Trapper John, M.D. – Guard / Onlooker #1 / Officer #1
1980: Rage! – Guard
1982: Quincy, M.E. – Judge
1994: Star Trek: Deep Space Nine – Cos
1995: ER
1995: NYPD Blue – Mr. Markham (final appearance)

References

External links 

 
 

1915 births
2004 deaths
American male film actors
American male stage actors
American male radio actors
American male television actors
20th-century American male actors